Michael William Warfel (born September 16, 1948) is an American prelate of the Roman Catholic Church serving as the bishop of the Diocese of Great Falls-Billings in Montana since 2007.  He served as bishop of the Diocese of Juneau in Alaska from 1996 to 2007.

Biography

Early life 
Michael Warfel was born on September 16, 1948, in Elkhart, Indiana. He attended Indiana University, but before his graduation enlisted in the U.S. Army.  Warfel served in South Vietnam for 18 months during the Vietnam War, then spent 13 months in South Korea. 

After leaving the Army in 1971, Warfel entered St. Gregory's College Seminary in Cincinnati, Ohio, obtaining a Bachelor of Philosophy degree. Warfel received a Master of Divinity degree from Mount St. Mary's Seminary of the West in Cincinnati.  He attended St. Michael's College in Colchester, Vermont, for his Master of Theology degree. While a seminarian, Warfel visited his sister in Alaska. He received permission to change from studying to be a priest of the Diocese of Fort Wayne-South Bend to study for the Archdiocese of Anchorage.

Priesthood 
Warfel was ordained to the priesthood by Francis Hurley for the Archdiocese of Anchorage on April 26, 1980.  After his ordination, Warfel served in various Alaska parishes. He was parochial vicar at St. Benedict Parish in Anchorage from 1980 to 1985, then pastor of Sacred Heart in Wasilla, from 1985 to 1989; then pastor of St. Mary in Kodiak from 1990 to 1995. While there, Warfel instituted a Sunday Mass in Spanish for Spanish-speaking parishioners. He became pastor of Our Lady of Guadalupe in Anchorage in 1995.

Bishop of Juneau 
On November 19, 1996, Warfel was appointed as the fourth bishop of the Diocese of Juneau by Pope John Paul II. He received his episcopal consecration on December 17, 1996, from Archbishop Francis Hurley, with Bishops Michael Kaniecki and William Skylstad serving as co-consecrators. 

In 1997, Warfel mediated a dispute over subsistence fishing rights between the Alaska Native Brotherhood, a Native Alaskan advocacy group,  and the Territorial Sportsmen, an association that sponsors fishing tournaments. As bishop, Warfel served as chair of the Committee on Evangelization within the United States Conference of Catholic Bishops (USCCB) from 1999 to 2002.

Warfel was named apostolic administrator of the Diocese of Fairbanks on October 23, 2001. His term ended with the appointment of Bishop Donald Kettler on June 7, 2002.

Bishop of Great Falls-Billings 
Pope Benedict XVI named Warfel the seventh bishop of the Diocese of Great Falls-Billings on November 20, 2007. He was installed by Archbishop John Vlazny on January 16, 2008. Within the US Conference of Catholic Bishops (USCCB), Warfel is chair of the Subcommittee on Catholic Home Missions and a member of the administrative committee.

In July 2018, Warfel reprimanded two priests from the diocese who, in clerical garb. attended a rally in Great Falls, Montana, for President Donald Trump. The rally organizers seated the two men in the first row behind the podium. They were seen clapping when Trump joked about the MeToo movement and referred derisively to U.S. Senator Elizabeth Warren as "Pocahontas". Warfel told the priests that they should have worn civilian clothes to the rally and should have requested less visible seats.

In 2010 Warfel was the keynote speaker at the Msgr. Philip J. Murnion Lecture of the Catholic Common Ground Initiative, giving an address entitled, "Journey to Communion in Christ". He is a member of the Catholic Common Ground Advisory Committee. Warfel serves on the board of the Montana Catholic Conference. He is a board member for the University of Providence in Great Falls.

In the fall of 2021, anticipating his retirement in 2023, Warfel asked for the appointment of a coadjutor bishop to assist him. In response, Pope Francis named Reverend Jeffrey M. Fleming as coadjutor bishop on April 19, 2022.

See also

 Catholic Church in the United States
 Historical list of the Catholic bishops of the United States
 List of Catholic bishops of the United States
 Lists of patriarchs, archbishops, and bishops

References

External links

Roman Catholic Diocese of Great Falls–Billings Official Site
 Warfel, Michael W., "Why Gun Control?", America, April 15, 2000
  

 

1948 births
Living people
The Athenaeum of Ohio alumni
Catholics from Alaska
Catholics from Indiana
Catholics from Montana
Catholics from Ohio
Roman Catholic bishops of Great Falls–Billings
Roman Catholic bishops of Juneau
20th-century Roman Catholic bishops in the United States
21st-century Roman Catholic bishops in the United States
Indiana University alumni
People from Elkhart, Indiana
Religious leaders from Alaska
Religious leaders from Montana
Religious leaders from Ohio